Kurt Gimmi (13 January 1936 – 29 March 2003) was a Swiss professional road bicycle racer. He was born and died in Zürich and was a professional from 1958 until 1964. He won the eleventh stage of the 1960 Tour de France and the 1959 Tour de Romandie.

Major results

 1959
 1st, Overall, Tour de Romandie
 1st, Stage 1 part b Tour de Romandie, Carouge (SUI)
 2nd, Stage 2 Tour de Romandie, Carouge (SUI)
 1st, Stage 3a Tour de Suisse

 1960
 1st, Stage 11 Tour de France
 2nd, Overall, Tour de Suisse (SUI)
 3rd, Stage 2
 2nd, Stage 5

 1961
 1st, Stage 5 Tour de Suisse

 1963
 1st, Stage 5 Tour de Suisse

External links 

Swiss male cyclists
Swiss Tour de France stage winners
1936 births
2003 deaths
Cyclists from Zürich
Tour de Suisse stage winners